Jonah: A VeggieTales Movie is a 2002 American computer-animated Christian musical comedy adventure film produced by Big Idea Productions and released by Artisan Entertainment through its F·H·E Pictures label. It is the first feature-length film in the VeggieTales series. The themes for the film are compassion and mercy, using two stories as illustrations linked by the Pirates Who Don't Do Anything, who were first seen in the Silly Song of the same name in Very Silly Songs!. The first story takes place in the current day and concerns a mishap with Bob the Tomato and Dad Asparagus on the way to a concert; the second, set in ancient times, is based directly on the biblical story of Jonah. Through both stories, compassion and mercy play a role in giving people a second chance.

Jonah: A VeggieTales Movie premiered on August 14, 2002, and came out as a regular release two months later on October 4. It received generally positive reviews from critics, who praised the humor and narrative style. The film grossed $25.6 million against a $14 million production budget, making it the highest-grossing film released by Big Idea Productions.

The film came out on VHS and DVD on March 4, 2003, as a worldwide home video release in both full-screen and anamorphic widescreen formats with a two-disc collector's edition. A DVD reprint with the feature and bonus features was released on Blu-ray in 2011 by Lionsgate (Artisan's successor).

Plot

Bob the Tomato and Dad Asparagus are driving Veggie children to see the popular singer "Twippo" in concert. During the drive, Laura taunts the other children because she won a backstage pass, which particularly annoys Junior. Bob briefly loses control of the van after being hit in the back of the head by a guitar, and Laura loses her pass in the chaos. To make matters worse, soon afterwards a porcupine shoots out two of the van's tires, and the van veers off the road and careens down a hill, stopping short of a river.

At a nearby restaurant, Bob blames Dad Asparagus for the crash and Junior argues with Laura about losing her pass. Junior is met by The Pirates Who Don't Do Anything, who tell Junior he was being rather tough on his friend and encourage him to show some compassion. To illustrate their point, they tell all the Veggies a story about a man of God named Jonah.

Jonah is a Prophet of ancient Israel who goes from town to town delivering God's messages. One night, God asks him to deliver a message to the people of Nineveh; however, Jonah is unwilling to preach a word of repentance to the Ninevites since they are people of corruption and instead tries to flee from the Lord by having The Pirates sail him to Tarshish. After leaving port, a guilt-stricken Jonah goes below deck to rest where he meets Khalil.

After experiencing a nightmare, Jonah awakens to find the ship beset by a great storm. Captain Pa Grape concludes the storm has been sent because God is angry at someone on the ship. The group decides to play Go Fish to divine who is at fault. Jonah loses the game and is forced to walk the plank and as soon as Jonah is off the ship, the skies clear. The Pirates attempt to reel Jonah back in, but before they can do so, Jonah is swallowed by a giant whale. The pirates attack the whale using a cannon with a bowling ball as ammo. The whale swallows the ball, disgorges Jonah's lifebelt, and swims away.

Inside the belly of the whale, Khalil finds Jonah, who realizes that he disobeyed God in trying to run from Him and is certain that his death is near. The pair are soon visited by a host of God's angels, who explain if Jonah repents, God will grant him a second chance. Jonah gladly repents, and after spending three days and nights in the belly of the whale, he and Khalil are spat up onto the shore, where they ride Reginald to Nineveh.

After Jonah is denied entrance to the city, the Pirates appear, explaining they won the Mr. Twisty's Twisted Cheese Curls sweepstakes which grants them free access to Nineveh where they are produced. The group is soon arrested after Larry accidentally steals several bags of Cheese Curls thinking they were free samples, and they are sentenced to death. As a last request, they are granted an audience with King Twistomer. Jonah then delivers the message given to him by God and tells the Ninevites that they should immediately repent of their sins or Nineveh will be destroyed; King Twistomer and the Ninevites listen to Jonah's message and repent.

Still expecting God to destroy Nineveh for their past sins, Jonah watches and waits from a distance in the hot sun. God provides a plant to shade Jonah, only for Khalil to eat a single leaf off the plant, which kills it. Jonah laments the dead plant, and Khalil is disappointed Jonah shows compassion for a plant, but not the Ninevites. Khalil then tries to explain God is compassionate and merciful and that he wants to give everyone, both Israelites and non-Israelites, a second chance. Jonah refuses to accept this and states it would be better if he was dead. The story ends with Khalil and Reginald leaving Jonah to his sulking.

Back in the present day, the Veggies are disappointed in the anticlimactic ending, but come to understand the point of the story: God wants everybody to show compassion and mercy, even to those that do not seem to deserve it. Twippo then appears in the restaurant unexpectedly and offers to give everybody a lift to the concert, while Bob forgives Dad Asparagus and Junior gives his Twippo ticket to Laura. The film ends with a song and the arrival of a tow truck driver, who is none other than Khalil.

Cast
Phil Vischer as Jonah/Twippo (Archibald Asparagus), Pa Grape, Mr. Lunt, Brutter (Mr. Nezzer), Phillipe Pea, Bob the Tomato, Percy Pea, King Twistomer and Cockney Pea #2
Mike Nawrocki as Larry the Cucumber, Jean Claude Pea, Jerry Gourd, Cockney Pea #1, Self-Help Tape Voice and BBQ Whooping Pea
Tim Hodge as Khalil
Lisa Vischer as Junior Asparagus
Dan Anderson as Mike Asparagus
Kristin Blegen as Laura Carrot
Shelby Vischer as Annie Onion
Jim Poole as Angus (Scooter) and the Townsperson
Ron Smith as the City Official and the Crazed Jopponian

Production
In 1999, Phil Vischer proposed a film adaptation of VeggieTales based on the story of Jonah. The film's script and songs were completed soon afterwards. In 2000, Big Idea announced that the film will be released sometime in 2002. A teaser trailer for the film was released with the episode "Lyle, the Kindly Viking" 1 year and 7 months before the film's release. The film was the first to be animated entirely in Autodesk Maya. Before the film's release, Vischer predicted that the film would break even if it grossed $25 million, and it ended up grossing just barely over that much, at $25.6 million.

Music

Reception

Box office
Jonah was released on October 4, 2002, in 940 theaters, debuting at sixth place with $6.2 million in its first weekend of release. It fell 40.9% in its second weekend, falling to eleventh place with $3.7 million.

At the end of its original theatrical run, the film had grossed over $25.6 million worldwide. It was not released in most countries outside America due to its heavy religious themes.

Critical response
Based on 56 reviews collected by review aggregator website Rotten Tomatoes, 66% of critics have given the film a positive review, with an average rating of 5.86/10. The site's critics consensus reads, "Jonah teaches wholesome messages to children in a funny, bouncy package." At Metacritic, the film has a weighted average score of 58 out of 100 based on 20 critics, indicating "mixed or average reviews". Bruce Fretts of Entertainment Weekly argued that despite its cheesy humor, it was saved by its "bouncy animation and catchy songs".

Pete Croatto of the now-defunct Filmcritic.com praised the film as "a blast of educational energy", later citing it as an example of the surprises critics can find in viewing every film they can regardless of expected quality.

Home media
Jonah: A VeggieTales Movie was released on a two-disc DVD by Artisan on March 4, 2003. The release includes three different audio commentaries, one by the directors, one by the producer and animation director, and one featuring the directors acting as their respective characters Larry the Cucumber and Mr. Lunt. On the second disc, special features include six featurettes for the "Behind the Scenes" section, five featurettes for the "Music" section, five featurettes for the "Bonus Material" section, five featurettes for young audiences in the "Fun!" section, six trailers, and five Easter eggs. On March 8, 2011, Lionsgate released the film on Blu-ray, with most of the DVD's special features retained.

The commentary featuring Larry and Mr. Lunt has received special praise from home media reviewers. Jeffrey Kauffman of Blu-ray.com stated that it "verges on the surreal and should be enjoyed by those who love Monty Python". David Blair of DVD Talk stated that it was "without a doubt the craziest, outright pointless, and most enjoyable commentary I've ever had the good fortune to hear", adding that he "found it substantially funnier than the movie itself".

The film was reissued on DVD and Blu-ray for its 20th anniversary by Studio Distribution Services.

Notes

References

External links

2002 films
2000s American animated films
2000s musical films
2002 animated films
2002 computer-animated films
American children's animated comedy films
American children's animated fantasy films
American children's animated musical films
American computer-animated films
Artisan Entertainment films
Big Idea Entertainment films
Films about Christianity
Christian animation
Films based on the Hebrew Bible
Films set in the 8th century BC
Jonah
Pirate films
VeggieTales films
2002 directorial debut films
Films set in ancient Israel
2000s English-language films